Smiley (stylised as x‿x (SMiLEY)) is the debut extended play (EP) by South Korean singer Choi Ye-na. It was released on January 17, 2022, by Yuehua Entertainment.

Background 
From June 15 to August 31, 2018, Choi (together with Everglow members Kim Si-hyeon and Wang Yiren) represented Yuehua Entertainment on reality girl group survival show Produce 48. She eventually placed fourth and debuted with Iz*One. The group's debut extended play (EP) Color*Iz was released on October 29, 2018, with "La Vie en Rose" serving as its lead single. On April 29, 2021, Iz*One officially disbanded after the end of their contract.

On January 2, 2022, Yena announced the release date and schedule for her debut EP Smiley. A representative from her agency, Yuehua Entertainment shared:

Track listing

Accolades

Charts

Weekly charts

Monthly charts

Release history

References

Korean-language EPs
2022 debut EPs